3rd Earl of Orford may refer to:

 George Walpole, 3rd Earl of Orford (1730–1791), British administrator, politician, and peer
 Horatio Walpole, 3rd Earl of Orford (1783–1858), British peer and politician